Eaglesfield is a village and former civil parish, now in the parish of Dean, in Allerdale district, in the county of Cumbria, in England. Historically part of Cumberland, it is near the A5086 road, 2.5 miles (4 km) southwest of Cockermouth and is located just outside the Lake District National Park. In 1931 the parish had a population of 233.

Etymology
Eaglesfield lay in the early Middle Ages within the British kingdom of Rheged, and the first element of the name is perhaps derived from the Brythonic 'eccles' "church" (cognate with Welsh 'eglwys' 'church'). The meaning would be 'open land near a British church' - something that the Anglian settlers would have seen as they "arrived and settled some two miles away down below at Brigham." (The second element, 'Feld', is Old English for 'open country').

Alternatively, it means 'Ecgel's open land' ('Ecgel's feld'). 'Ecgel' is a personal name and possibly "a normal diminutive of compound names such as 'Ecglaf', or Ecgwulf' ".

Governance
Eaglesfield is in the parliamentary constituency of Copeland, Trudy Harrison is the Member of Parliament.

Before Brexit, it was in the North West England European Parliamentary Constituency.

For Local Government purposes it is in the Dalton Ward of Allerdale Borough Council and part of the Cockermouth South Ward of Cumbria County Council.

Eaglesfield does not have its own parish council, instead it is part of Dean Parish Council, which also covers villages of  Dean, Deanscales, Branthwaite, Pardshaw and Ullock.

Eaglesfield was a township in Brigham parish. From 1866 Eaglesfield was a civil parish in its own right until it was merged with Dean on 1 April 1934.

Notable people
Eaglesfield was the birthplace of John Dalton (1766–1844), acclaimed chemist, meteorologist and physicist. He was the father of the modern atomic theory.

Eaglesfield was the probable birthplace of Robert de Eglesfield (c.1295–1349), founder of the Queen's College, Oxford. His father, John of Eglesfield, held lands in and near there.

Moorland Close, Eaglesfield, was the birthplace of Fletcher Christian, master's mate aboard . He led the mutiny against the captain, William Bligh, during their voyage to Tahiti.

See also

Listed buildings in Dean, Cumbria

References

External links
  Cumbria County History Trust: Eaglesfield (nb: provisional research only - see Talk page)

Villages in Cumbria
Former civil parishes in Cumbria
Dean, Cumbria